Strug may refer to:

People
Andrzej Strug, Polish socialist politician
Kerri Strug, American gymnast

Places
Strug a settlement in northeastern Slovenia
Strug (river) a river in Poland

Other
Strug a Polish term for plane (tool)
Strug (boat), a type of Russian river boat in the 11th through 18th centuries

See also